Alexander Blair may refer to:

 Alexander Blair (architect) (1867–1931), American architect
 Alexander Blair (rugby union) (1865–1936), Scottish rugby union player
 Alexander Blair (writer) (1782–1878), English writer and academic